ZDN may refer to:

 ZDN, the Beijing–Guangzhou railway station code for Zhumadian railway station, Henan, China
 ZDN, the Ministry of Railways station code for Zahedan railway station, Iran